Allen Albert Funt (September 16, 1914 – September 5, 1999) was an American television producer, director, writer and television personality, best known as the creator and host of Candid Camera from the 1940s to 1980s, as either a regular television show or a television series of specials. Its most notable run was from 1960 to 1967 on CBS.

Early life and education
Funt was born into a Jewish family in New York City, New York. His father Isidore Funt was a diamond wholesaler, and his mother was Paula Saferstein Funt.

Allen graduated from high school at age 15. Too young to attend college on his own, he studied at Pratt Institute (also located in Brooklyn). He later earned a bachelor's degree in fine arts from Cornell University, studied business administration at Columbia University, then returned to Pratt for additional art instruction.

Career

Radio and television
Trained in commercial art, Funt worked for an advertising agency in their art department, but he eventually moved to its radio department. Among his first jobs for radio, he wrote for Truth or Consequences and assisted US First Lady Eleanor Roosevelt with her radio commentaries.

Drafted into the military during World War II and stationed in Oklahoma, Funt served in the Army Signal Corps, eventually making radio shows. He began his signature program on ABC Radio as The Candid Microphone on June 28, 1947, and it ran until September 23, 1948. The program was revived on CBS June 6 – August 29, 1950.  He soon experimented with a visual version by doing a series of theatrical short films also known as Candid Microphone. These film shorts served as a springboard for his entrance into television on August 10, 1948. The show ran on all three major TV networks and in syndication while hosted by Allen Funt until he was sidelined by a stroke in 1993. The syndicated version of Candid Camera was broadcast from 1974 to 1979; his co-hosts included, at various times, John Bartholomew Tucker, Phyllis George and Jo Ann Pflug.

In 1964, Funt appeared as himself in an episode of the situation comedy The New Phil Silvers Show.

Films
During the 1970s, Funt made two documentary films based on the hidden camera theme: the X-rated What Do You Say to a Naked Lady? (1970) and Money Talks (1972). In the 1980s, Funt produced a series of adult-oriented videos called Candid Candid Camera.

Other pursuits
Funt donated his recordings and films to his alma mater Cornell University and established a fellowship at Syracuse University for postgraduate studies in radio and television "aimed at providing the broadcast industry with qualified black personnel."

He established a foundation which used laughter therapy for seriously ill patients by providing videocassettes of Candid Camera episodes. He also taught psychology at Monterey Peninsula College.

Personal life
In 1946, Funt married Evelyn Michal (1920–2014) with whom he had three children, Peter, Patricia and John. In 1964 the couple was divorced and the same year Funt married Marilyn Laron, from whom he was divorced in 1978. The couple had two children, Juliet and William. Funt had seven grandchildren.

On February 3, 1969, Funt, his wife, and his two youngest children boarded Eastern Airlines Flight 7 in Newark, New Jersey, with a destination of Miami, Florida. While en route, two men hijacked the plane and demanded passage to Cuba. However, some of the passengers, having spotted Funt, believed the whole thing to be a Candid Camera stunt. Funt repeatedly attempted to persuade his fellow passengers as to the reality of the hijacking, but to no avail. The plane landed in Cuba, finally convincing the passengers. Funt and the other passengers were released after 11 hours of captivity.

Funt amassed a collection of works by the Victorian painter Lawrence Alma-Tadema and engineered an exhibition of them at the Metropolitan Museum of Art (bypassing the wishes of then director Thomas Hoving). The collection's value skyrocketed as a result, and Funt sold them at a handsome profit.

Funt resided in Croton-on-Hudson, Westchester County, New York. His estate, White Gates, was sold to opera singer Jessye Norman in the early 1990s. Both ranches were eventually bought by The Trust for Public Land which expected to turn the land over to the US Forest Service.

After a stroke in 1993, he became incapacitated and died in 1999 in Pebble Beach, California, 11 days before his 85th birthday. Candid Camera continued with his son, Peter Funt, as host.

References

Further reading
Alma-Tadema (Catalogue of the Funt Collection) compiled by Russell Ash, Sotheby's Belgravia, 1973

External links

1914 births
1999 deaths
20th-century American Jews
American television directors
Television personalities from California
American television writers
Columbia Business School alumni
Cornell University alumni
American male television writers
Television producers from New York City
Hijacking survivors
People from Croton-on-Hudson, New York
People from Monterey County, California
Screenwriters from California
Screenwriters from New York (state)
Television producers from California
20th-century American screenwriters
20th-century American male writers
Practical jokes